The Gualala River is a river on the northern coast of California. Most of the river is in Sonoma County, but a portion is in Mendocino County. The headwaters of the  river (measuring via its South Fork) are high in the Coast Range, and it empties into the Pacific Ocean. For its last few miles, it forms the boundary between Sonoma County and Mendocino County.

John Sutter's militia captain Ernest Rufus is credited with naming the river. There is disagreement about whether the name is originated from the Pomo word Walali meaning where the waters meet or English for What Water read The Law. (Que Agua Le La Ley)

The river has three forks: the South Fork, Wheatfield Fork and the North Fork. The South Fork is the longest and travels northwest, parallel to the coast along the San Andreas Fault rift zone. The Wheatfield Fork begins west of Lake Sonoma and has the largest flow of the three forks. Its tributaries include Tombs, Wolf, House, Haupt and Fuller creeks. Wheatfield is the first fork to combine with the South Fork. Buckeye Creek, a tributary of the river, joins the South Fork next. It is followed by Rockpile Creek and Big Pepperwod Creek. The North Fork is the only part of the river in Mendocino County. It travels roughly southwest towards the coast along the San Andreas Fault rift zone and meets the South Fork at the border between the counties, a few miles before the river flows into the ocean.

The watershed is sparsely populated. Timber production is the predominant land use, historically and currently. Grazing was previously important but has become less prevalent.

The river provides recreation, municipal and industrial water supply for the community of Gualala, California, and wildlife habitat including cold freshwater habitat for fish migration and spawning.  The most important problem for the watershed is excessive erosion. The area has a high degree of natural erosion because of uplift and displacement caused by the San Andreas Fault, which runs through the area. However, logging and roads have greatly increased the amount of sedimentation in the river. Kelly Road, which runs between Lake Sonoma and Annapolis, is a major source of sediment in the river and its tributaries. High water temperatures is another significant problem. Logging has removed large streamside trees that provided shade and reduced the amount of large woody debris, which creates pools.

In 2002, Alaska businessmen and former Reagan administration Interior Department official Ric Davidge announced plans to collect water from the Albion and Gualala rivers in large bags and tow it several hundred miles south to San Diego as drinking water. However, the plan drew local opposition, and was eventually shelved after the state government passed new laws requiring extensive studies of the effects on fish habitats before any such plan could proceed. The governor later signed a law declaring the two rivers as recreational areas, preventing similar attempts at exploiting their resources.

See also

Gualala Point Regional Park
List of rivers in California
List of watercourses in the San Francisco Bay Area

References

External links
Friends of the Gualala River
Klamath Resource Information System
Gualala River Watershed Council
California Coastal Watershed Program - Gualala River
Video of the lower Gualala River

Rivers of Sonoma County, California
Rivers of Mendocino County, California
Rivers of Northern California